Evaru is a 2019 Indian Telugu-language crime thriller film directed by Venkat Ramji. The film was produced by Pearl V. Potluri, Param V. Potluri and Kavin Anne. The film starring Adivi Sesh, Regina Cassandra, Naveen Chandra and Murali Sharma.The film is produced by Warner Bros. Pictures. Evaru is a remake of loosely based on the 2016 Spanish film The Invisible Guest (2016) by Oriol Paulo.

The plot follows the story of corrupt cop Vikram Vasudev as he investigates a seemingly open-and-shut case of a woman killing her rapist. The music is composed by Sricharan Pakala and editing by Garry BH. The film was released on 15 August 2019.

Plot 
Sameera Maha (Regina Cassandra), a rising businesswoman, fatally shoots and kills DSP Ashok Krishna (Naveen Chandra), who allegedly raped her. The case is filed as an act of self-defense but the police and Ashok’s family hire Ratnakar, a prestigious criminal lawyer, for prosecution. Sameera's lawyer, Banerjee (Vinay Varma), then contacts corrupt Sub-Inspector Vikram Vasudev (Adivi Sesh), who is based in Coonoor. He takes a bribe from Sameera to make sure Ratnakar does not uncover any incriminating evidence.

Vikram meets Sameera in a hotel room and presses her to fully disclose the details of the situation so that he knows where they stand in their defense. Sameera continually proclaims that Ashok forced himself on her until Vikram shows her proof that her husband, famed CEO Rahul Maha (Syed Irfan Ahmed), is homosexual and she went to college with Ashok. Sameera then reveals she is only a beard to Rahul, which allows him to keep up the appearance of a married heterosexual man while indulging in his true sexual interests in private. Sameera also confesses that she and Ashok dated in college but parted ways when his parents did not approve of her then middle-class status. 2 years prior, they met by chance and restarted their relationship.

Vikram tells Sameera about a missing persons case he is working on: 1 year ago, a teenage cancer patient, Adarsh Varma (Nihal Kodhaty), filed a missing complaint for his father, Vinay (Murali Sharma). Vikram initially made the case priority when Adarsh bribed him but grew committed to helping the Varma family despite later pressure from his superiors to drop the case. Vikram discovered that Vinay was frequently receiving calls from a police station in Panjagutta and his car was left damaged outside a building of the resort he owns. Adarsh and his mother also gave a lift to a girl named Vaishnavi the night of Vinay's disappearance. Vikram followed the last photo Vinay took to a hairpin turn on a road in Coonoor, where he found a sideview mirror broken off from a black car. The car was traced back to a rental agency in Hyderabad, having been rented in the name of Vaishnavi Krishna by her husband, Ashok, who is based in the Panjagutta Police Station. Later, Vikram learned that Adarsh had snuck into an event in Hyderabad Ashok was working at to confront him. Ashok unintentionally confirmed that he knew Vinay and prepared to shoot Adarsh, but Vikram saved him. As they were leaving the event, Adarsh spotted the honored guest, "Vaishnavi", who is actually Sameera.

Sameera tries to deny this, but Vikram reveals her old cellphone was found with Vinay's blood, linking her and Ashok to the case. Sameera reveals that she and Ashok were driving to Coonoor for a rendezvous when she accidentally crashed into Vinay around the hairpin turn. A drunken Ashok accosted Vinay until Sameera intervened. They arrived at a resort building Ashok was planning to buy and again met Vinay, the resort owner. However, based on their previous encounter, he refused to sell it. Sameera tried to reason with him, but Vinay revealed he is a family friend of Rahul and knows she is his fiancée. He advises Sameera to end her affair with Ashok. Suddenly, a furious Ashok punched Vinay, causing him to stumble over the fencing on the overlook and fall into the forest a hundred feet below.

Vinay was barely alive when they rushed down so Ashok prevented Sameera from calling an ambulance and killed him. As he got rid of the body, Sameera ran out of the forest and hitchhiked with a woman and her cancer-ridden son, whose face was covered. She soon realized they were Vinay's family after discovering she had picked up his phone instead of hers. Upon arriving at their house, Sameera left the phone in the car and fled. She called Ashok from a payphone and he picked her up, after which they left Coonoor. 1 year later, Sameera and Ashok were blackmailed by an anonymous person to bring two crores to Vinay's resort. In the room, the couple decided instead to confess to Vinay's family together. They started to have sex when Ashok attempted to kill Sameera to save himself, but she fought back and killed him.

Vikram does not believe her, pointing out several inconsistencies in the story, and theorizes that Sameera actually killed Vinay since she had more to gain from the murder. Vikram reveals he was the blackmailer and knows that Ashok was planning on confessing beforehand; Ashok had called Vikram (as the blackmailer) before going into the resort, and kept him on the phone in his back pocket. Sameera killed Ashok when he told her his intentions and then staged the scene to make it look like he raped her.

Knowing that Vikram is intent on helping Adarsh, Sameera offers him two crores to remove Vinay's body and pin his death on Ashok in order to destroy Ratnakar's evidence against her in court. To ensure his cooperation, she threatens to reveal to Vikram's superiors the initial bribe he took from her. Vikram asks where Vinay's body is, and Sameera explains that after she pushed Vinay off the overlook, he had disappeared when she got down to the forest. Sameera told Ashok to flee in the car while she searched for Vinay, eventually finding he had reached the road. Sameera ambushed Vinay, finished him off, and buried him in a nearby construction site next to a temple before hitchhiking with his family. Shocked at her ruthlessness, Vikram reveals a microphone he had planted in the room, which recorded her confession. Sameera pulls a gun on him but the police arrive and arrest her for the murders of Vinay and Ashok. As Vikram leaves, Sameera protests that he is corrupt but the lead police officer reveals he is Vikram Vasudev and the man who just left is actually Adarsh Varma.

Adarsh had originally taken up his father's case with the real Vikram, and became suspicious of Sameera when he saw her on a magazine and recognized her as "Vaishnavi". After Vikram had dropped the case due to pressure from his superiors, Adarsh compiled the evidence himself for over a year as he recovered from cancer. Following Ashok's murder, Adarsh proposed to Vikram that he assume the officer's identity and meet with Sameera in order to get her to confess. The movie ends with Adarsh and his mother arriving at the site where Sameera had buried his father's corpse.

Cast 
 Adivi Sesh as Sub-Inspector Vikram Vasudev
 Naveen Chandra as DSP Ashok Krishna 
 Regina Cassandra as Sameera 'Sam' Maha
 Murali Sharma as Vinay Varma
 Nihal Kodhaty as Adarsh Varma 
 Pavitra Lokesh as Adarsh Varma's Mother
 Raja Ravindra as Inspector Suresh
 Pammi Sai as Constable Reddy
Sasidhar as the Cop
Vinay Varma as Banerjee, Sameera's Lawyer.
Syed Irfan Ahmed as Rahul Maha, Sameera's husband.

Production 
The film has been shot in Hyderabad and Kodaikanal. The last schedule of the film was wrapped up in July 2019.

Soundtrack

The music of the film is composed by Sricharan Pakala while lyrics are by V N V Ramesh Kumar.

Reception

Critical reception 
Firstpost gave 3.5 out of 5 stars stating "This is a film which pushes you to keep up with the pace of the action, drama, and the conversations between the lead characters, because the devil lies in the details.".

The Times of India gave 3 out of 5 stars stating "Evaru is gripping to the core and has some decent technical values, but the film does lets itself down at times with gaps in the narration".

Home Media 
The film's digital distribution rights was bagged by Amazon Prime Video.

See also
 Badla, Hindi-language adaptation of The Invisible Guest

References

External links 
 

2010s Telugu-language films
Indian thriller drama films
2019 films
2019 thriller drama films
2019 crime thriller films
Films scored by Sricharan Pakala
2019 crime drama films
Films shot in India
Indian crime thriller films
Indian crime drama films
Indian remakes of Spanish films
Films shot in Telangana
Warner Bros. films